The United Homeland Party is an Armenian political party. It was founded on 23 April 2021 and is currently led by economist Mher Terteryan.

History
The party was founded during the 2020–2021 Armenian protests and does not maintain any political representation within the National Assembly. The party currently acts as an extra-parliamentary force.

The party confirmed its intentions to participate in the 2021 Armenian parliamentary elections and also stated that they opposed forming any political alliances. The candidate list was led by Lusine Avagyan. Following the election, the party won just 0.08% of the popular vote, failing to win any seats.

Ideology
The party supports strengthening the military of Armenia, protecting the environment, improving healthcare, and maintaining strong cooperation with Russia.

Electoral record

Parliamentary elections

See also

 Programs of political parties in Armenia

References

External links 
 United Homeland Party on Facebook

Political parties established in 2021
Political parties in Armenia
2021 establishments in Armenia